Portugal. The Man is an American rock band from Wasilla, Alaska, currently based in Portland, Oregon. The group consists of John Baldwin Gourley, Zach Carothers, Kyle O'Quin, Jason Sechrist, Eric Howk and Zoe Manville. Gourley and Carothers met and began playing music together in 2001 at Wasilla High School.

The group released two albums on Fearless Records, released three albums on their own label Approaching AIRballoons in a parnership with Equal Vision Records, then moved to Atlantic Records in 2010, with whom they have released their latest three full-lengths. Their 2017 single "Feel It Still" won "Best Pop Duo/Group Performance" at the 60th Annual Grammy Awards.

History

Origin (2002–2006)
Around August 2002, the band Anatomy of a Ghost was formed by John Gourley, Joe Simon, Dewey , Nick Simon, and Zach Carothers. Gourley fronted the band having had no previous singing experience. Anatomy of A Ghost quickly gained popularity, but before long, the group broke up. Portugal. The Man was originally started as John Gourley's side project, with Carothers playing bass. Before they had a drummer, they used drum machines and synth-loops as the backing beat. Gourley and Carothers teamed up with Wesley Hubbard, Nick Klein (former guitar tech for Anatomy of a Ghost) and Harvey Tumbleson, and formed Portugal. The Man. The band left Alaska and went to Portland with the intent of recording and touring. The band recorded demos in the summer of 2004, followed by a U.S. tour that fall. In spring 2005, Klein and Tumbleson left and soon after Jason Sechrist joined the band. Portugal. The Man's debut record Waiter: "You Vultures!" was released by Fearless Records on January 24, 2006. The album was produced by Casey Bates.

Band name 
The band's name is based on the idea of David Bowie's "bigger than life" fame. They wanted the band to have a bigger-than-life feel but did not want to name it after one of their members. "A country is a group of people," guitar player and vocalist John Gourley explains. "With Portugal, it just ended up being the first country that came to mind. The band's name is 'Portugal'. The period is stating that, and 'The Man' states that it's just one person" (any one of the band members). The name has a more personal meaning as well: Portugal. The Man was going to be the name of a book that Gourley had planned to write about his father and his many adventures.

Independent years (2007–2010)

On July 24, 2007, they released their second full-length album, Church Mouth, again produced by Casey Bates, and set out on a full U.S. headline tour with support from The Photo Atlas, Play Radio Play, Tera Melos and The Only Children among others. They then toured Europe and followed it up with another US headlining tour with support from Rocky Votolato and Great Depression during September and October. Following this tour, they joined Thursday on a short east coast tour in November alongside Circle Takes The Square.

In 2008, the band left their label, Fearless Records, and added Ryan Neighbors, their touring keyboardist, as an official member and replacement for Wes Hubbard. On July 30, 2008, it was announced that Portugal. The Man was releasing Censored Colors under its independent record label, Approaching AIRballoons, in partnership with Equal Vision Records. It was released August 1. Zoe Manville, a musician and graphic designer, was involved with this album and has an active involvement on all albums since 2008 including vocals on many of the tracks on Woodstock. John Gourley was also chosen as the recipient of the 2008 Alternative Press "Best Vocalist of the Year".

In 2009, Portugal. The Man played at Bonnaroo and also at Lollapalooza in Grant Park, Chicago. Their fourth album, The Satanic Satanist, was released on July 21, 2009. Themed around memories and stories from singer John Gourley's youth in Alaska, the album was recorded with the help of record producer Paul Q. Kolderie.

The band's fifth studio album, American Ghetto, was released on March 2, 2010. In order to avoid a leak, no copies of the album were solicited until the release date.

In the Mountain in the Cloud (2010–2012)
In April 2010, Portugal. The Man announced their signing to Atlantic Records. During the summer of 2010, the band went back into the studio to record their new album with producer John Hill. They recorded the album in El Paso, Texas, London, England, and San Diego, California. Andy Wallace mixed the album.

Starting in April 2011, Portugal. The Man began releasing one 30-second clip every week from their new album via their YouTube channel, with a 13-minute short film "Sleep Forever", directed by Michael Ragen, premiered in June of that year. The full album, In the Mountain in the Cloud, was released on July 19, 2011.

Portugal. The Man made their second appearance at the Bonnaroo Music and Arts Festival for the festival's 10th anniversary in June 2011, as well as another Lollapalooza appearance in August. On August 8, 2011, after their Lollapalooza show, the band's van and trailer were stolen. The van and trailer contained all of the band's instruments and performance gear. The van was recovered the following day, but the contents of the trailer were missing. A list of the missing equipment was made available by the band. John Gourley was reported saying that, "Basically every bit of money Portugal. The Man has made over the last five years was in that trailer." Four days after the theft, much of the band's gear was recovered from the home of a man who claimed to have purchased it at a flea market. The band posted a thank you note on their website saying, "it is more than just a win for PTM, it is also a win for Twitter, the world of social media, the Chicago police, and old school journalism." The man was charged with one felony count of theft for purchasing the stolen equipment.

In late 2011, Portugal. The Man went on a US headlining tour with the addition of guitarist Noah Gersh to the band. They also went on tour in Europe in January 2012, opening for The Black Keys and going on to Australia to headline and perform at St Jerome's Laneway Festival. In the spring of 2012, they headlined the Norman Music Festival in Norman, Oklahoma, as well as the Jägermeister Music Tour with The Lonely Forest.

Keyboardist Ryan Neighbors left the group in April 2012, to pursue his own music career with his new project Hustle and Drone, and was replaced by Kyle O'Quin. Drummer Jason Sechrist was replaced by former child actor and drummer Kane Ritchotte shortly after Neighbors' departure.

Evil Friends (2013–14)

The band's seventh album, Evil Friends, was released on June 4, 2013, preceded by a single of the same name in March of that year. Produced by Danger Mouse, and featuring guest appearances from Este and Danielle Haim, the album was influenced by Pink Floyd and The Dark Side of the Moon. A music video of "Purple Yellow Red and Blue" followed. Later in the year, singles from Evil Friends, including "Evil Friends" and "Purple, Yellow, Red and Blue", were remixed by artists including Bear Mountain, Terry Urban and Passion Pit.

Woodstock (2014–2020)
In November 2014, Portugal. The Man were in the studio recording their eighth album with Mike D from The Beastie Boys producing. The band also actively updated their Instagram account with pictures of them in the studio with Mike D, as well as showcasing small teasers of what their new album would sound like. Mac Miller was also shown working with the band. During this period, guitarist Eric Howk, formerly from The Lashes, joined the band. Howk, who grew up with Gourley and Carothers in Wasilla, had been in talks to join the band in 2007, however an accident on May 5, 2007, left him paraplegic and unofficially tabled this decision.

The first week of May 2015, the band released teasers on social networks of what appeared to be new music with a Latin twist with huapango guitars, dream synths and drums machines. On May 5, Portugal. The Man released a Spanish version of "Purple Yellow Red and Blue" covered by a Mexican-American band called The Chamanas on their official YouTube channel to celebrate the Mexican festivities (Cinco de Mayo). On December 31, 2015, Portugal. The Man posted to their website that they had completed two records followed by separate hashtags #Gloomin + #Doomin. However, on February 3, 2016, the band tweeted from their official account that the new record would be entitled Gloomin + Doomin. In February 2016, Portugal. The Man were featured on the Yoko Ono collaboration album Yes, I'm A Witch Too performing "Soul Got Out of the Box".

On November 30, 2016, Triple J radio debuted Portugal. The Man's new song "Noise Pollution". It was released as a single, "Noise Pollution [Version A, Vocal Up Mix 1.3]", on December 2, and featured Mary Elizabeth Winstead and Zoe Manville. On March 3, 2017, the band released a single titled "Feel It Still" off their eighth studio album, Woodstock. The release was followed by an accompanying music video three days later. It was revealed that Gloomin + Doomin "failed to complete" and was thrown out after three years.

The album's title was inspired by an original 1969 Woodstock music festival ticket stub owned by Gourley's father. It led Gourley to a realization that almost 50 years later, music has the same mission as then – "to comment on societal and political unease." "We worked with so many rad people on this album, but ended up with just the four of us in a basement at 4 a.m. trying to say something that mattered," said Gourley. "Trying to write music that would help people feel they're not alone, even if they're angry or feeling lost." Woodstock was released on June 16, 2017. The band caused some controversy during their performance of "Feel It Still" at the American Music Awards in November 2017 because of their backdrop that read: "No computers up here, just live instruments." Critics felt that the implication was that bands who use backing tracks were less artistically relevant than ones who used only live instruments.

"Feel It Still" became the band's biggest hit single to date in the United States, reaching No. 1 on the Billboard Alternative Songs, Hot 100 Airplay, and Pop Songs charts and becoming a Top 5 hit on the Billboard Hot 100. 
On January 28, 2018, "Feel It Still" won Best Pop Duo/Group Performance at the 60th Annual Grammy Awards and would go on to win the Alternative Rock Song of the Year at the 2018 iHeartRadio Music Awards. The band also received the ASCAP Vanguard Award at the ASCAP Pop Music Awards in April 2018.

"Live in the Moment" became a #1 track on the Billboard Alternative Songs chart during the week of March 26, 2018.  It additionally gained the honor of the track with the most spins (plays) during a week's time, that has ever been recorded on Alternative radio at 3,503. Beginning in February 2018, the band embarked on a world tour in support of Woodstock with stops in North America, Europe, and Australia that is due to end in October 2018. Prior to every show on the tour, the band has been introduced with a video featuring the Mike Judge characters Beavis and Butt-Head.

In support of their album, the band has also appeared on numerous television programs. In July and August 2017, they played "Feel It Still" on The Tonight Show Starring Jimmy Fallon and Conan, respectively. The latter show featured a four-piece string section. In September 2017, it played "Feel It Still" on The Ellen DeGeneres Show and returned to that program in March 2018, playing "Live in the Moment" with the USC marching band. In February 2018, Portugal. The Man appeared on The Late Show with Stephen Colbert playing "Live In The Moment" with backing from the PS22 Children's Chorus and the BKSteppers drumline. In April 2018, the group performed "Feel It Still" and "Live in the Moment" with a string quartet on Jimmy Kimmel Live!. The following month, the band again played "Live In The Moment", this time on The Late Late Show with James Corden.

Chris Black Changed My Life (2021–present)
On April 16, 2021, the band released Oregon City Sessions, a live album recorded in December 2008 in a studio in a Portland, Oregon suburb. The band contributed a cover of the Metallica song "Don't Tread on Me" to the charity tribute album The Metallica Blacklist, released in September 2021.

On March 1, 2023, the band released "Dummy", the first single off their upcoming ninth studio album, Chris Black Changed My Life. Produced by Jeff Bhasker and dedicated to a late friend of the band, the album will be released by Atlantic Records on June 23, 2023. It will be supported by a tour beginning in June 2023 at Bonnaroo Music Festival. Prior to its release as a single, the song received significant attention after it was featured in a Taco Bell commercial.

Music videos and short films
On June 6, 2011, Portugal. The Man released a short film featuring the songs "Sleep Forever" and "Got It All (This Can't Be Living Now)" from their album, In The Mountain In the Cloud. Produced by Richard Hutchins and directed by Michael Ragen, the film features 13 minutes and 16 seconds of Alaskan wilderness intertwined with scenes of John Gourley dog sledding before he is forced to travel by foot after his dogs abandon him.

Portugal. The Man has also released music videos for their songs "So American", "People Say", "All Your Light", "Do You", "The Dead Dog", "AKA M80 the Wolf", "Lay Me Back Down", "The Sun", "Evil Friends", "Purple Yellow Red and Blue", "Atomic Man" and "Modern Jesus". The video for "Noise Pollution" was released on December 1, 2016.

The video for "Feel It Still" was released on March 6, 2017, and received attention for its imagery of a burning newspaper titled Info Wars. The video features Gourley walking through a post-apocalyptic wasteland and was directed by Ian Schwartz. It also features around 30 "hidden Easter eggs." Clicking on specific items at specific times in the video provides viewers with links to web pages described as "tools for resistance." For example, one shot shows a couple engaging in sex. By clicking that Easter egg, viewers are taken to the Planned Parenthood site. Other Easter egg links include a video describing a protestor's legal rights, a direct phone call to the White House, and links for buying custom-designed protest posters and graffiti stencil kits. The YouTube video has over 326,000,000 views.

Activism

Throughout the band's history, it has engaged in political activism and philanthropy in a variety of forms. On April 22, 2014, the band announced a partnership with the Smithsonian's National Zoo and Conservation Biology Institute to release a limited-edition run of 400 vinyl records aimed at raising awareness for the critically endangered Sumatran tiger species, of which there were only 400 remaining in the wild at the time. The track, "Sumatran Tiger", was released only in its vinyl form rather than on digital platforms. Individual copies were sent by mail to "400 carefully chosen influencers, among them actors, activists, musicians, conservationists, bloggers and journalists," and the band claimed that the song was the first "meant to go extinct unless it's reproduced." Recordings of the song could later be found on the internet using the hashtags #EndangeredSong and #SumatranTiger. The "Endangered Song", as it was also known, won a Bronze Award at the 2014 Clio Music Awards.

In 2015, the band partnered with StubHub and Dr. Martens to help raise $1 million to put instruments in schools throughout the United States. The initiative was carried out in partnership with The Mr. Holland's Opus Foundation and focused on schools and institutions with limited funding. In June 2016, the band headlined the Gleason Fest, an indie music festival that raises money for the ALS non-profit, Gleason Initiative Foundation.

In August 2017, Portugal. The Man donated all proceeds from its Charlottesville, Virginia show to the Charlottesville Area Community Foundation in response to the Unite the Right rally that ultimately led to the vehicular homicide of activist Heather Heyer. In May 2018, the band cancelled a planned appearance on the Australian TV program, Sunrise, after racist statements made by guest panelist Prue MacSween caused controversy.

In March 2018, the band gave a free live concert at the March for Our Lives in Portland, Oregon, after having collaborated with local students planning the event, openly stating their support for tightened gun legislation.

In July 2018 during shows in Oregon, Portugal. The Man helped raise mental health awareness in partnership with Logan Lynn's public advocacy campaign, Keep Oregon Well. The band is also a partner with the non-profit organization, HeadCount, which seeks to promote "participation in democracy" often by helping concertgoers register to vote. In September 2018, the band helped raise $20,000 for a benefit supporting Noise For Now in Birmingham, Alabama.

In 2019, the band received the Legend Award at that year's Native American Music Awards in Niagara Falls, New York. In January 2020, the group was honored with the Public Sector Leadership Award from the National Congress of American Indians at a banquet in Washington, D.C. Both awards were given in recognition of the band's activism and advocacy for Indigenous rights, including for the land acknowledgement ceremonies that took place before every show on the group's international tour.

Also in early 2020, Portugal. The Man founded the PTM Foundation, a non-profit charitable organization that primarily focuses on funding causes related to Indigenous peoples' communities. The organization also aims to work toward the improvement of mental health issues, environmental issues, disability rights, and human rights through advocacy, philanthropy, community involvement, and increased awareness. In response to the Matanuska-Susitna Borough School District board voting to remove five "controversial" books from the school curriculum in May 2020, the organization offered to buy those books for any student in the district who requested copies.

Portugal. The Man endorsed Bernie Sanders for president in the 2020 Democratic Party presidential primaries, playing at rallies in Iowa and Washington.

Awards and nominations
{| class="wikitable plainrowheaders"
|-
! Year !! Awards !! Work !! Category !! Result
|-
! scope="row"| 2013
| UK Music Video Awards
| "Modern Jesus"
| Best Rock/Indie Video – International
| 
|-
! scope="row" rowspan="2"| 2014
| World Music Awards
| Evil Friends
| World's Best Album
| 
|-
| Clio Music Awards
| "Endangered Song"
| Bronze Award for Innovative Media
| 
|-
! scope="row" rowspan=4|2017
| Electronic Music Awards
| "Feel It Still" (Medasin Remix)
| Remix of the Year 
| 
|-
| UK Music Video Awards
| "Rich Friends"
| Best Interactive Video
| 
|-
| LOS40 Music Awards
| Themselves
| Blackjack Artist Award
| 
|-
| Cannes Lions International Festival of Creativity
| rowspan=3|"Feel It Still"
| Bronze Lion
| 
|-
! scope="row" rowspan=13|2018
| Grammy Awards
| Best Pop Duo/Group Performance
| 
|-
| rowspan=3|Billboard Music Awards
| Top Rock Song
| 
|-
| Woodstock
| Top Rock Album
| 
|-
| rowspan=6|Themselves 
| Top Rock Artist
| 
|-
| ASCAP Pop Awards
| Vanguard Awards
| 
|-
| New Music Awards
| TOP40 Group of the Year
| 
|-
| Pollstar Concert Industry Awards
| Best New Headliner 
| 
|-
| rowspan=3|iHeartRadio Music Awards
| Duo/Group of the Year 
| 
|-
| Alternative Rock Artist of the Year 
| 
|-
| rowspan=2|"Feel It Still"
| Alternative Rock Song of the Year 
| 
|-
| rowspan=2|Teen Choice Awards
| Choice Song: Group
| 
|-
| Themselves 
| Choice Rock Artist
| 
|-
| Webby Awards
| rowspan=2|"Feel It Still"
| Online Film & Video – Best Use of Interactive Video 
| 
|-
! scope="row" rowspan=4|2019
| Global Awards
| Best Song
| 
|-
| iHeartRadio Music Awards
| Themselves
| Alternative Rock Artist of the Year 
| 
|-
| Hungarian Music Awards
| Woodstock
| International Modern Pop-Rock Album of the Year
| 
|- 
| Native American Music Awards
| rowspan="2"| Themselves
| Legend Award
| 
|-
! scope="row"| 2020
| NCAI Leadership Awards
| Public Sector Leadership Award
|

Band members
Current members
John Baldwin Gourley – lead and backing vocals, rhythm and lead guitar, organ, synthesizers, drum machines, bass guitar 
Zachary Scott Carothers – bass guitar, percussion, backing and lead vocals 
Jason Sechrist – drums 
Kyle O'Quin – keyboards, synthesizers, organ, rhythm guitar, backing vocals 
Zoe Manville – backing and lead vocals, percussion 
Eric Howk – lead and rhythm guitar, backing vocals 

Former members
Nick Klein – guitar 
Wesley Hubbard – keyboards 
Harvey Tumbleson – beats 
Garrett Lunceford – drums 
Kane Ritchotte – drums, percussion, backing vocals 
Ryan Neighbors – keyboards, didgeridoo, synthesizers, backing vocals 
Noah Gersh – guitar, backing vocals, percussion 

Touring musicians
Kirk Ohnsted – beats
Dewey  – guitar
Matthew Moore – guitar
Nick Reinhart – guitar

Timeline

Discography

Studio albums
 Waiter: "You Vultures!" (2006)
 Church Mouth (2007)
 Censored Colors (2008)
 The Satanic Satanist (2009)
 American Ghetto (2010)
 In the Mountain in the Cloud (2011)
 Evil Friends (2013)
 Woodstock (2017)
 Chris Black Changed My Life (2023)

References

External links

Portugal. The Man's official website
Interview with Zach Carothers
Interview with Portugal.The Man on TheWaster.com
Portugal. The Man Interview on the www.anchorageobserver.com, November 2012
Interview with Zach Carothers and John Gourley about their fandom and work with influence "Weird Al" Yankovic on Dave & Ethan's 2000" Weird Al Podcast
Portugal. The Man - Feel It Still (Official Music Video)

Atlantic Records artists
2004 establishments in Oregon
Equal Vision Records artists
Fearless Records artists
Grammy Award winners
Indie rock musical groups from Oregon
Musical groups established in 2004
People from Wasilla, Alaska
Indie rock musical groups from Alaska
Musical quintets
Defiance Records artists